Guarente is an Italian surname. Notable people with the surname include:

Leonard P. Guarente (born 1952), American biologist
Mario Guarente (born 1983), Italian politician
Tiberio Guarente (born 1985), Italian footballer

Italian-language surnames